The 1974 Commercial Union Assurance Masters) was a men's tennis tournament played on outdoor grass courts in Kooyong, Melbourne in Australia. It was the 5th edition of the Masters Grand Prix and was held from 10 December through 15 December 1974.

Finals

Singles

 Guillermo Vilas defeated  Ilie Năstase 7–6, 6–2, 3–6, 3–6, 6–4
 It was Vilas' 11th title of the year and the 13th of his career.

References

 
Commercial Union Assurance Masters, 1974
Com
Grand Prix tennis circuit year-end championships
Tennis tournaments in Australia
Commercial Union Assurance Masters